Band Together was a musical concert put on for the people of Canterbury, New Zealand as a response to the 2010 Canterbury earthquake which had occurred a month earlier. It was held on 23 October 2010 at Christchurch's Hagley Park.

Organised by Opshop frontman Jason Kerrison and New Zealand music personality Paul Ellis, over 31 different acts performed on two stages erected in the city's North Hagley Park, many of whom had been raised in the region and wanted to give back to their hometown.

With appearances by Christchurch mayor Bob Parker, the Prime Minister of New Zealand, John Key. and a number of media personalities including Hilary Barry, Jason Gunn, Simon Barnett, it was broadcast live across New Zealand from midday through to 8pm on TV3.

Performers
Performers included (in order of performance):

Dame Malvina Major
Te Kotahitanga Kapa Haka
Che Fu
King Kapisi
Dane Rumble
A'ppreeshiate
Nathan King
Clap Clap Riot
Ray Columbus
Dinah Lee
Ivy Lies
Barry Saunders and The Eastern with Lindon Puffin
The Dukes
Julia Deans
Anika Moa
Swarm Dance Crew
Minuit
The Feelers
The Bats
Evermore
Midnight Youth
Bic Runga
Opshop
J Williams
Dave Dobbyn
The Exponents

References

Benefit concerts
2010 in music
2010 in New Zealand
2010 in New Zealand music
Music festivals in New Zealand